Bontnewydd is an unstaffed halt on the narrow gauge Welsh Highland Railway. The halt was opened on 31 May 1999 on the petition of the villagers of Bontnewydd and is between Caernarfon and Dinas on the Lôn Eifion cycle route. It is a request stop with no station buildings and a single low platform. The train services are operated by the Festiniog Railway Company.

See also 
A halt existed here on the horse-drawn Nantlle Railway from 1856 to 12 June 1865. From the outset timetables appeared regularly in the "Carnarvon & Denbigh Herald" and in Bradshaw from October 1856.

Notes

Sources

External links
The Welsh Highland Railway Project - official reconstruction site
Ffestiniog & Welsh Highland Railways
Rebuilding The Welsh Highland Railway - an independent site
Welsh Highland Railway Timetables

Heritage railway stations in Gwynedd
Welsh Highland Railway
Bontnewydd, Gwynedd
Railway stations built for UK heritage railways